Love & Anarchy is a Swedish romantic comedy television series. It is Netflix's second Swedish-language series, following Quicksand. It was produced by the same company, FLX. The series was created by Lisa Langseth, who also served as the head writer, together with Alex Haridi. The story follows a professional married woman with children who finds herself playing a daring game with a young male employee.

The first season premiered on 4 November 2020; the second on June 16, 2022.

Premise 
Sofie is an ambitious consultant and married mother of two children living in Stockholm. When Sofie receives the order to restructure an old and well-established publishing house, Lund & Lagerstedt, her orderly life begins to fall apart at the seams. It begins when she meets the young IT expert Max, and begins an unexpected and daring flirtation with him. In the process, they develop a flirtatious little game whereby they both take turns challenging each other to do things that contradict established social norms.

Their harmless games soon turn into bitter seriousness as the challenges, and the resulting consequences, become bigger and more uncontrollable.

Cast and characters 
 Ida Engvoll as Sofie, a successful consultant and married mother of two 
 Björn Mosten as Max, the IT temp at Lund & Lagerstedt 
 Johannes Bah Kuhnke as Johan, Sofie's controlling and manipulative husband, a successful commercial director
 Björn Kjellman as Ronny, the weak-willed CEO of Lund & Lagerstedt 
 Reine Brynolfsson as Friedrich, one of the veteran publishers at Lund & Lagerstedt
 Gizem Erdogan as Denise, one of the veteran publishers at Lund & Lagerstedt
 Carla Sehn as Caroline, the receptionist at Lund & Lagerstedt

Episodes

Season 2

References

External links
 
 

2020 Swedish television series debuts
2020s romantic comedy television series
Lisa Langseth
Swedish comedy television series
Swedish-language Netflix original programming